The first Women's World Chess Championship took place during the 1st Chess Olympiad, held from 18 to 30 July 1927 in London. It was organized by FIDE and was played as a full round-robin tournament. Vera Menchik won the championship, conceding only half a point in her 11 games. The final results were as follows:

{| class="wikitable"
! !!Player !! 1 !! 2 !! 3 !! 4 !! 5 !! 6 !! 7 !! 8 !! 9 !! 10 !! 11 !! 12 !! Points
|- style="background:#ccffcc;"
| style="background:gold;"|1 ||  || - || 1 || 1 || 1 || ½ || 1 || 1 || 1 || 1 || 1 || 1 || 1 || 10½
|-
| style="background:silver;"|2 ||  || 0 || - || 0 || 1 || 1 || 1 || 1 || 1 || 1 || 1 || 1 || 1 || 9
|-
| style="background:#cc9966;"|3 ||  || 0 || 1 || - || 1 || 1 || 1 || 0 || ½ || 0 || 1 || ½ || 1 || 7
|-
| 4 ||  || 0 || 0 || 0 || - || ½ || 1 || ½ || 1 || ½ || 1 || 1 || ½ || 6
|-
| 5 ||  || ½ || 0 || 0 || ½ || - || 0 || 1 || 0 || 1 || 1 || 1 || 1 || 6
|-
| 6 ||  || 0 || 0 || 0 || 0 || 1 || - || 1 || 1 || 1 || 0 || ½ || 1 || 5½
|-
| 7 ||  || 0 || 0 || 1 || ½ || 0 || 0 || - || 0 || 1 || 0 || 1 || 1 || 4½
|-
| 8 ||  || 0 || 0 || ½ || 0 || 1 || 0 || 1 || - || 0 || 1 || 0 || ½ || 4
|-
| 9 ||  || 0 || 0 || 1 || ½ || 0 || 0 || 0 || 1 || - || 0 || 1 || 0 || 3½
|-
| 10 ||  || 0 || 0 || 0 || 0 || 0 || 1 || 1 || 0 || 1 || - || ½ || 0 || 3½
|-
| 11 ||  || 0 || 0 || ½ || 0 || 0 || ½ || 0 || 1 || 0 || ½ || - || 1 || 3½
|-
| 12 ||  || 0 || 0 || 0 || ½ || 0 || 0 || 0 || ½ || 1 || 1 || 0 || - || 3
|}

References 

Women's World Chess Championships
1927 in chess
1927 in London
Chess in London